Tragédie is a French rap and R&B duo made up of Thierry Rakotomanga (a.k.a. Tizy Bone) and Daniel Guiro (a.k.a. Silky Shaï) from Nantes, France. They had 3 singles that reached #1 in France.

Discography

Studio album
2003: Tragédie
2004: À fleur de peau
2010:  TBA

Singles
2003: "Hey Oh"
2004: "Sexy pour Moi"
2004: "Eternellement"
2004: "Je reste Ghetto" (featuring Reed the Weed)
2004: "Gentleman"
2005: "Bye Bye" (featuring Calvin Scott)
2005: "L'art du corps et du cœur"
2005: "Merci"

Solo singles
Tizy Bone
2009: Ola''
Silk Shaï
2009: C'est Mon Son

External links
 Silk Shaï on Myspace

References

Musical groups established in 1998
French hip hop groups
French musical duos
Musical groups from Pays de la Loire